Brenderup is a town located on the island of Funen in south Denmark, in Middelfart Municipality.

Notable people 
 Frederik Hilfling-Rasmussen (1869 in Brenderup – 1941) a Danish-born Norwegian photographer

References 

Cities and towns in the Region of Southern Denmark
Middelfart Municipality